Bert Schneider (29 August 1937 – 2 July 2009) was a Grand Prix motorcycle road racer from Austria. His best years were in 1962 when he finished fourth place in the 500 cc world championship, and in 1964 when he finished fourth in the 125 cc world championship. He won a single Grand Prix race during his career, the 1963 125 cc Belgian Grand Prix.

References 

1937 births
2009 deaths
Austrian motorcycle racers
125cc World Championship riders
250cc World Championship riders
350cc World Championship riders
500cc World Championship riders
Isle of Man TT riders